Cymindis blanda is a species of ground beetle in the subfamily Harpalinae. It was described by Casey in 1913.

References

blanda
Beetles described in 1913